Louis Dunford is a British singer songwriter from London. The son of actress Linda Robson, he is known for writing the song The Angel - North London Forever which in 2022 became an anthem for Arsenal F.C. and Arsenal F.C. supporters.

Personal life
He is the son of English actress and television personality Linda Robson and her husband Mark Dunford. In 2012 Louis Dunford and Charlie Quirke alternated playing the role of Travis Stubbs on the stage version of their mothers' comedy television show Birds of a Feather.

Career
Dunford is from Islington in North London where he began playing the piano aged 15 after his family moved into a house which happened to have a piano already in it which he then had to persuade his parents to keep. He started playing Elton John songs and then began to mix music with his own poetry. He learnt to play guitar because the piano was too loud to play late at night in the house. He played his first gig at a pub called The Library and afterwards he said to his father he would eventually sell out The Union Chapel venue opposite it, which he did in 2022. Dunford's music was discovered by Jamal Edwards in 2014 through hearing his song When We Were Hooligans on YouTube. Dunford has said he writes songs about the area around him, his experiences and his friends. His first EP The Morland chronicled life on the Morland Estate in Islington as he saw it. The first single from that EP London's Requiem was a version of the first song he ever wrote. In 2021 Dunford signed with Sony Music and released a cover of East 17's hit single Stay Another Day, the video for which featured Dunford wearing the white fur trimmed parka jacket visible in the 1994 Christmas number one song video. In 2022 Dunford supported Jake Bugg on tour.

Dunford's second EP Popham EP contained the song The Angel - North London Forever which has since become an anthem for the fans of Arsenal F.C. and has begun to be played in the pre-match of every home game Arsenal play at the Emirates Stadium. Dunford himself is an Arsenal fan and wrote the song as a paean to the culture and sense of community in North London. Dunford and the song were featured in the Amazon Original documentary series All or Nothing: Arsenal about the 2021–22 Arsenal F.C. season.

References

Living people
English male singer-songwriters
21st-century English singers
21st-century British male singers
Singers from London
People from the London Borough of Islington
Arsenal F.C. mass media
Year of birth missing (living people)